Betty Lise Anderson is an American electrical engineer, working in the field of photonics.  She has been a professor at the Ohio State University since 1990.  She is a Fellow of SPIE, and a Senior Member of the Optical Society of America and of the Institute of Electrical and Electronics Engineers.

Education 

 1978 - Bachelors of Science in Electrical Engineering (Syracuse University)
 1988 - Masters in Science (University of Vermont)
 1990 - Ph.D. in Materials Science and Electrical Engineering (University of Vermont)

Early career 
Anderson began her career as a teacher at an experimental elementary school, where she worked for two years.  After leaving teaching, she worked in industry for nine years at Tektronix, Inc., C.S. Draper Labs, and GTE Laboratories.

Research interests 
Anderson's research interests include laser diodes, interferometry, optoelectronic devices, fiber sensing, optical interconnection, and optical multiplexing.

Awards and recognition 

 2022 - National Science Board Public Service Award
 2015 - Fellow of SPIE
 2015 - University Outreach and Engagement Award (Ohio State University)
 2015 - Distinguished Community Engagement Award (Ohio State University)
 2014 - Women in Engineering Faculty Award for Outreach and Engagement (Ohio State University)
 2012 - Faculty Diversity Award (Ohio State University)
 2007 - Innovators Award (Ohio State University)
 2006 - Outstanding Woman in Technology: Top Contributor to the Advancement of Technology Award (TechColumbus, now Rev1 Ventures)
 2005 - Outstanding Woman of the Year
 2000 - Annual Research Accomplishment Award (Ohio State University)

Outreach 
Anderson leads 'Engineering Outreach', a program within the College of Engineering at the Ohio State University.  Her program focuses on going out to schools, after-school camps, and STEM clubs in and around Columbus, Ohio, to building interest in STEM subjects from female and minority students.

Bibliography 
Anderson co-wrote a book with Richard Anderson entitled 'Fundamentals in Semiconductor Devices', published by McGraw-Hill in 2005.

References

Living people
American electrical engineers
Syracuse University alumni
American women engineers
University of Vermont alumni
Year of birth missing (living people)
Optical engineers
Laser researchers
Ohio State University faculty
American non-fiction writers
Women in optics
American materials scientists
Women materials scientists and engineers
American women academics
21st-century American women